Carlos Mario Ceballos Agualimpia, known simply as Carlos Ceballos (born September 13, 1981 in Cali, Colombia) is a professional Colombian footballer.

References

External links
 

1981 births
Living people
Colombian footballers
Colombian expatriate footballers
Cortuluá footballers
Deportes Quindío footballers
Deportes Tolima footballers
Deportivo Pereira footballers
Millonarios F.C. players
Once Caldas footballers
C.D. ESPOLI footballers
Maccabi Ahi Nazareth F.C. players
F.C. Ashdod players
Hakoah Maccabi Amidar Ramat Gan F.C. players
Liga Leumit players
Israeli Premier League players
Atlético de Rafaela footballers
Lota Schwager footballers
Expatriate footballers in Chile
Expatriate footballers in Argentina
Expatriate footballers in Venezuela
Expatriate footballers in Ecuador
Expatriate footballers in China
Expatriate footballers in Israel
Expatriate footballers in Honduras
Jiangsu F.C. players
Carabobo F.C. players
Wuhan F.C. players
Chinese Super League players
China League One players
Parrillas One players
Association football forwards
Footballers from Cali
Categoría Primera A players
Primera Nacional players